Vantasselite is a rare aluminium phosphate mineral with formula: Al4(PO4)3(OH)3 •9H2O. It crystallizes in the orthorhombic system and has a white color, a hardness of 2 to 2.5, a white streak and a pearly luster.

It occurs in a quartzite quarry north of Bihain, Belgium It was first described in 1987 and named after Belgian mineralogist René Van Tassel.

References

Phosphate minerals
Aluminium minerals
Orthorhombic minerals